This is a list of schools in the Metropolitan Borough of St Helens in the English county of Merseyside.

State-funded schools

Primary schools

Allanson Street Primary School, Parr
Ashurst Primary School, Blackbrook
Bleak Hill Primary School, Windle
Broad Oak Community Primary School, Parr
Carr Mill Primary School, Moss Bank
Chapel End Primary School, Billinge
Corpus Christi RC Primary School, Rainford
The District CE Primary School, Newton-le-Willows
Eaves Primary School, Sutton
Eccleston Lane Ends Primary School, Eccleston
Eccleston Mere Primary School, Eccleston
Garswood Primary and Nursery School, Garswood
Grange Valley Primary School, Haydock
Haydock English Martyrs' RC Primary School, Haydock
Holy Cross RC Primary School, St Helens
Holy Spirit RC Primary School, Parr
Legh Vale Primary School, Haydock
Longton Lane Community Primary School, Rainhill
Lyme Community Primary School, Newton-le-Willows
Merton Bank Primary School, Merton Bank
Newton-le-Willows Primary School, Newton-le-Willows
Nutgrove Methodist Primary School, Nutgrove
Oakdene Primary School, Rainhill
Parish CE Primary School, St Helens
Queen's Park CE/URC Primary School, Dentons Green
Rainford Brook Lodge Community Primary School, Rainford
Rainford CE Primary School, Rainford
Rectory CE Primary School, North Ashton
Rivington Primary School, Dentons Green
Robins Lane Community Primary School, Sutton
St Aidan's CE Primary School, Billinge
St Anne's RC Primary School, Sutton
St Ann's CE Primary School, Rainhill
St Austin's RC Primary School, Nutgrove
St Bartholomew's RC Primary School, Rainhill
St James's CE Primary School, Haydock
St John Vianney RC Primary School, Thatto Heath
St Julie's RC Primary School, Eccleston
St Mary & St Thomas' CE Primary School, St Helens
St Mary's RC Infant School, Newton-le-Willows
St Mary's RC Junior School, Newton-le-Willows
St Mary's RC Primary School, Billinge
St Mary's RC Primary School, Blackbrook
St Peter and St Paul RC Primary School, Haresfinch
St Peter's CE Primary School, Newton-le-Willows
St Teresa's RC Primary School, Dentons Green
St Theresa's RC Primary School, Sutton
St Thomas of Canterbury RC Primary School, Windle
Sherdley Primary School, Sutton
Sutton Manor Community Primary School, Sutton
Sutton Oak CE Primary School, Sutton
Thatto Heath Community Primary School, Thatto Heath
Wargrave CE Primary School, Newton-le-Willows
Willow Tree Primary School, Sutton

Secondary schools

Cowley International College, Windle
De La Salle School, Eccleston
Hope Academy, Newton-le-Willows
Outwood Academy Haydock, Haydock
Rainford High School, Rainford
Rainhill High School, Rainhill
St Augustine of Canterbury Catholic Academy, Blackbrook
St Cuthbert's Catholic High School, Sutton
The Sutton Academy, Sutton

Special and alternative schools
Lansbury Bridge School, Parr
Launchpad Centre, St Helens
Mill Green School, Parr
Pace, Broad Oak
Penkford School, Newton-le-Willows

Further education
Carmel College
St Helens College

Independent schools

Senior and all-through schools
Tower College, Rainhill

Special and alternative schools
Ash Meadow School, Sutton
Nugent House School, Billinge
This Is My Education - TIME, St Helens
Wargrave House School & College, Newton-le-Willows

St Helens
 List of schools in St Helens